The 11th Secretariat of the Communist Party of Vietnam (CPV), formally the 11th Secretariat of the Central Committee of the Communist Party of Vietnam (Vietnamese: Ban Bí thư Ban Chấp hành Trung ương Đảng Cộng sản Việt Nam Khoá XI), was partly elected by a decision of the 11th Politburo and partly elected by the 1st Plenary Session of the 11th Central Committee (CC) in the immediate aftermath of the 11th National Congress.

Members

References

Bibliography

11th Secretariat of the Communist Party of Vietnam